Oabnithi Wiwattanawarang (born 2 August 1994), nickname Oab, is a Thai actor and model. His most notable television series and films are The Blue Hour (2015), I Hate You I Love You (2016), Project S: The Series (2017), Inhuman Kiss (2019)...

Early life and education
Oabnithi was born on August 2, 1994. He is the son of Somchai Wiwattanawarang and Duangporn Wiwattanawarang. He has an older sister named Kunnit Wiwattanawarang (nickname Eye) and one younger sister named Nichakul Wiwattanawarang (nickname Ice). Oabnithi graduated high school from Wat Rajabopit School and graduated with a bachelor's degree from Faculty of Economics at Thammasat University.

Oabnithi, as a child, likes to play sports with his favorite sport is tennis. He had the opportunity to compete and win prizes in small competitions including being in the top 100 of Thailand in the age category under 14 years old.

Career
Oabnithi began in the entertainment industry when he met a scout talent at Bangkok BTS Skytrain who persuaded him to film an advertisement. After that, the music video director had the opportunity to watch Oabnithi's commercial audition tape and was interested. Oabnithi therefore starred in the first music video for the song "You Win" of FiFi BLAKE in 2012 and became more famous for his role as Jack in the teen series Hormones: The Series in 2013.

He was widely known and nominated for many awards for his role as Phum in the movie The Blue Hour (2015), starring opposite Atthaphan Phunsawat and again famous for his role as Ai in the series I Hate You, I Love You (2016), as well as his role as Noi in the movie Inhuman Kiss (2019).

Personal life
Oabnithi is currently in a relationship with actress Alisa Kunkwaeng (Maprang) since 2017.

Filmography

Films

Television series

References

External links
 
 

1994 births
Living people
Oabnithi Wiwattanawarang
Oabnithi Wiwattanawarang
Oabnithi Wiwattanawarang
Oabnithi Wiwattanawarang